Seven Sundays is a 2017 Philippine Family Comedy-drama film directed by Cathy Garcia-Molina. It stars Aga Muhlach, Ronaldo Valdez, Cristine Reyes, Dingdong Dantes and Enrique Gil. The film marks Muhlach's return since Of All The Things in 2012. The film was produced and released by Star Cinema on October 11, 2017.

Synopsis
Widowed and left by his children who are living their own lives with no time for the family, Manuel Bonifacio (Ronaldo Valdez) is lonely and distraught. One day, he calls his children, Allan (Aga Muhlach), Bryan (Dingdong Dantes), Cha (Cristine Reyes) and Dex (Enrique Gil), to reveal that he has been diagnosed with cancer and will soon die within seven weeks. The shocking news prompts the Bonifacio siblings to reunite with their father and help each other in his last days.

Plot

Pre-credit 
The movie starts by showing the Bonifacio children putting letters in a can of Rebisco biscuits for their father, Manuel Bonifacio, a former overseas Filipino worker. The opening scene also features the pictures of the family at different points in time.

Main Plot 
Capt. Manuel Bonifacio is a widower and former Barangay captain from Batangas who lives with his nephew Jun. On his birthday, he is greeted by the townsfolk as he celebrates another birthday, he also receives birthday greetings from his children as well; however, late in the evening he receives the news from Dr. Nelson that he has lung cancer and has only two to five months to live. 

All of the Bonifacio children: Allan, Bryan, Charmaine, and Dexter arrived to their old household and had to vote upon the fate of their father. The verdict was that Capt. Manuel gets to decide his fate. The children decided to visit the old family household for seven Sundays in spite of their own problems. Allan was dealing with his struggling due to a rivalling business owner named Mr. Kim, Bry wanted to meet a certain someone named Juliana Smith, Cha has to deal with her husband Jerry who keeps on cheating on her multiple times, and Dex was on the run from people after a botched concert event. 

Dex was the first to arrive to the old household after he was told by his roommates to hide somewhere else after some people were able to locate their room. He stayed for some time and went out to buy some call credits, and there he met Camille, his old friend. They went to Allan's store and realized that he is facing financial issues and was facing a rival business owner named Mr. Kim. 

The next day, the Bonifacio children decided to host a birthday party for their own father after not showing up to his birthday proper. They asked Jun to stall their father in order to buy some time; however, Capt. Manuel caught up with the act and pretended to be surprised. The party initially was boring but a basketball game was held after Marc wanted to play basketball. The basketball game got heated and Allan and Bry argued in the middle of the game, involving Cha and Dex in the process and causing their father to bring out knives to cause them to stop fighting.  

Capt. Manuel expressed disappointment to his nephew Jun and Jun asked his cousins to get along, even if they have to pretend. The next day, the siblings pretended to get along; however, they couldn't agree on how to bring their father to the funeral parlor. Capt. Manuel told them to prepare an advanced eulogy in the funeral parlor, which caused an awkward moment to the siblings and also caused to finally agree on something.   

While at the family household; Bry, Cha, and Dex got to talk about their past selves and there Capt. Manuel received a call from the doctor that he was misdiagnosed and that he simply had tuberculosis. Capt. Manuel did not want to disclose the news to his children with the fears that they will abandon him again.  

The next Sunday, the family went to the beach and had fun. Capt. Manuel showed an unusual amount of vigor, causing the family members to be suspicious of his true medical condition. Capt. Manuel showed his family a game wherein he picks out a letter from the old Rebisco can and the siblings had to guess who wrote the letter. This caused the siblings and their other family members to realize how distant they had become over the years.   

Dex stayed with his father and they bought ice cream together at Allan's store. They confronted Mr. Kim himself and Capt. Manuel realized the true financial situation of Allan. Dex hid again from those who were chasing him by asking Camille to mislead those finding him. Both Dex and Camille ate at a restaurant she was working in. He saw Jerry and a college student hitting it off in front of the restaurant causing Dex to hit Jerry, leaving Jerry with a huge bruise. While at it, Capt. Manuel called his son Bry to help Allan by telling about Allan's financial situation.   

Bry went back to the family household and talked to Allan, helping Allan by giving financial assistance and Allan helped Bry open up about Juliana, who turns out to be the biological mother to his child, Gian. Allan helped Bry in contacting Juliana, who is currently in the Philippines with her son. The next day, after Bechay's medical check-up, Dr. Nelson confronted both Allan and Bechay and told them that Capt. Manuel has a case of tuberculosis and not lung cancer as initially believed, causing Allan to confront his father and Capt. Manuel to tell him his reason of withholding his true medical reason to his family.      

One evening, as the family was preparing for dinner Dex confronted Cha about what actually happened to Jerry and overheard the conversation between his father and Jun about his true medical condition. Bry got a call from Louie, a fellow lawyer, and learned about what Dex allegedly did during the botched concert. This caused Bry to confront Dex and leading to the siblings fighting each other verbally because of their shortcomings. Because of this, the siblings left from the household and causing Capt. Manuel to lament on what transpired.      

The next day, Cha forced her husband to leave, causing her to cry; Allan went back to his store; Dex returned to his old room; and Bry to receive a message from Juliana. Allan lamented about the state of his incomplete house; however, his son told him about what he felt about his father, causing Allan to make amends to Bry and finding the other siblings. The siblings helped Bry in confronting Juliana and his own biological son Gian.      

The siblings then went to the cemetery where their late mother was buried. They saw their father talking to her grave, lamenting about how he felt like a failure in being a father to his own children. The siblings said their eulogy to their still-living father, as promised earlier from the funeral parlor. The family made one loving embrace after the eulogy.       

The movie ends with ABC's Family Store being rechristened as ABCD Family Store and Mr. Kim's brother arrived for his store's groundbreaking, causing both sides to taunt each other and challenging the family to a dance showdown, with Mr. Kim's brother losing to the family.

Cast

Main cast

Ronaldo Valdez as Capt. Manuel Bonifacio: The family patriarch, he invited his children for seven Sundays as he initially thought that he would die of lung cancer. 
Aga Muhlach as Allan A. Bonifacio: The firstborn of the family, he manages the ABC's Family Store, a family business founded by his father. He faces the issue of his business being threatened by Mr. Kim, an enterprising businessman.
Dingdong Dantes as Bryan "Bry" A. Bonifacio: The breadwinner of the family. He is a successful business manager and lawyer; however, he faced the issue of being apparently exploited by his own family members and wanted to meet his own biological son.
Cristine Reyes as Charmaine "Cha" A. Bonifacio: The only daughter of the family. She inherited much of her late mother's traits, such as her cooking skills as exemplified in cooking Pancit Bihon and playing piano music. She faced the issue of dealing with her cheating husband.
Enrique Gil as Dexter "Dex / Baby D" A. Bonifacio: The youngest in the family. He worked as a disc jockey; however, he was on the run from people especially that the concert he is involved in failed massively.

Supporting cast
Ketchup Eusebio as Jun: The nephew of Capt. Manuel and the cousin to his Allan, Bry, Cha, and Dex.
Kyle Echarri as Marc Bonifacio: Allan's son who idolizes Bry.
Donita Rose as Bechay Bonifacio: Allan's loving wife who is pregnant to another child.
Kean Cipriano as Jerry: Cha's husband, he cheated on her multiple times.
Kakai Bautista as Baby: Bry's secretary who has a one-sided relationship with Bry.
Charlie Dizon as Camille: Dex's old friend.
Jeffrey Tam as Mr. Kim: The rivalling business owner to Allan who threatened to buy the family store multiple times.
Kin Billote as Kath
Angelica Cruz as Leila
Angelee Cruz as Sofia
Gabriel Iribagon as Zac
Alyanna Angeles as Yna
Menggie Cobarriubias as Dr. Nelson: The family doctor of Capt. Manuel who initially diagnosed him with lung cancer.

Cameo appearances
Bela Padilla as Marie A. Bonifacio
Iza Calzado as Juliana Smith: Gian's biological mother.
Edward Barber as Gian S. Bonifacio: Bry's 19-year biological son.
Ryan Bang as Mr. Kim’s younger brother

Awards and nominations

In popular culture 
The movie is often compared to other films dealing with family, such as Tanging Yaman (2000), Four Sisters and a Wedding (2013, also distributed by Star Cinema), and Family Matters (2022).

The movie became a subject of memes especially in one memorable scene where Cha (Cristine Reyes) told Jerry (Kean Cipriano), that she could live without him and then crying afterwards.

References

External links
 

Philippine comedy-drama films
Star Cinema films